BUF may refer to:

 Buffalo, New York, the second most populous city in the U.S. state of New York
 Buffalo Bills, a National Football League team based in the Buffalo–Niagara Falls region
 Buffalo Sabres, a National Hockey League team based in the Buffalo–Niagara Falls region
 University at Buffalo, a public university known as "Buffalo" or "BUF"
 Amtrak station code for Buffalo-Depew Rail Station in Buffalo, New York
 IATA airport code for Buffalo Niagara International Airport, Buffalo, New York
 Baitul Futuh Mosque, London
 British Union of Fascists, a former fascist political party in the United Kingdom
 BUF Compagnie, a French visual effects company